Laddi (born Þórhallur Sigurðsson, 20 January 1947, in Hafnarfjörður) is an Icelandic comedian, actor, voice actor and entertainer known for comedy music and comedy acting. Laddi has dubbed many characters into Icelandic, in films and TV shows like The Smurfs and feature films like Aladdin.

He started off in a comedy duo with his brother Haraldur Sigurðsson, they were known as "Halli og Laddi" - Halli and Laddi.

He was in the music video "Triumph of a Heart" with Björk.

References

External links
 

1947 births
Icelandic comedians
Icelandic male voice actors
People from Hafnarfjörður
Living people